Bishwanath Ghosh may refer:

 Bishwanath Ghosh (writer), Indian writer and journalist
 Bishwanath Ghosh (footballer), Bangladeshi footballer